Archibald or Archie Brown may refer to:

 Archibald Brown (architect) (1881–1956), American architect
 Archibald G. Brown (1844–1922), British minister
 Archie Brown (historian) (born 1938), British political scientist and historian
 Archie Brown (rugby) (1894–?), Welsh rugby player
 Archie Scott Brown (1927–1958), British racing driver
 Archie Brown (footballer) (born 2002), English footballer